Jordan Loyd (born July 27, 1993) is an American professional basketball player for AS Monaco Basket of the LNB Pro A and the EuroLeague. He played college basketball at the University of Indianapolis, where he earned a degree in Environmental Sustainability.

Early life and college career
Loyd attended Milton High School in Alpharetta, Georgia, where he led Milton to a playoff appearance in each of his final two seasons, including a state championship as a junior in 2009–10. Loyd earned all-conference and team MVP honors as a senior after leading his squad to a top-five national ranking.

In his freshman year at Furman University, he averaged 6 points, 3.4 rebounds and 1.7 assists per game. In his sophomore year, Loyd transferred from Furman to the University of Indianapolis, where he quickly became a key part of the UIndy bench, averaging double-digits minutes.

Loyd finished his final Greyhound season averaging 20.9 points, 6.3 rebounds, and 2.5 assists, while shooting 50 percent from the field, 41 percent from 3-point range and 86 percent from the foul line. Loyd's name is all over the UIndy record book, as he finishes 25th all-time in scoring (1,213), fifth in career free throw percentage (.839), seventh in free throws made (329), 10th in 3-point percentage (.424), tied for 12th in 3-pointers made (132) and 16th in career scoring average (16.2). On March 2, 2016, Loyd earned a spot in the All-GLVC First team and Defensive team.

Professional career

Fort Wayne Mad Ants (2016–2017)
Loyd went undrafted in the 2016 NBA Draft. On October 31, 2016, Loyd has selected with the 48th overall pick in the 2016 NBA D-League Draft by the Fort Wayne Mad Ants. In 49 games played during the 2016–17 season, Loyd averaged 15.1 points, 4.2 rebounds and 4 assists per game.

Hapoel Eilat (2017–2018)
On June 27, 2017, Loyd joined the Indiana Pacers and the Toronto Raptors for the 2017 NBA Summer League.

On August 2, 2017, Loyd signed with the Israeli team Hapoel Eilat for the 2017–18 season. On January 4, 2018, Loyd recorded a career-high 30 points, along with 11 rebounds and 2 assists in an 85–69 win over Ironi Nes Ziona, he  was subsequently named Israeli League Round 11 MVP. On March 2, 2018, Loyd participated in the Israeli League All-Star Game as a replacement for Derwin Kitchen.

Loyd led Eilat to the 2018 Israeli League Playoffs, where they eventually lost to Hapoel Holon. Loyd finished the season as the league third-leading scorer with 17.4 points per game and also averaged 4.9 rebounds, 3.6 assists and 1.6 steals per game. On June 8, 2018, Loyd earned a spot in the All-Israeli League Second Team.

Toronto Raptors (2018–2019)
On June 25, 2018, Loyd signed a two-year deal with the Turkish team Darüşşafaka. Four days later, Loyd joined the Toronto Raptors and the Boston Celtics for the 2018 NBA Summer League. On August 7, 2018, after impressing during the Summer League, Loyd opted out of his deal with Darüşşafaka and signed a two-way contract with the Toronto Raptors. On October 29, 2018, he made his NBA debut playing two minutes under a 109–124 loss to the Milwaukee Bucks.

Loyd won a championship with the Raptors after they defeated the Golden State Warriors in the 2019 NBA Finals. Loyd became known as the "Random Guy in a Suit" due to being beside Kawhi Leonard during the Game 7 buzzer beater, which he recognized by wearing a shirt with this slogan during the Raptors Championship parade. Although Loyd did not play in the playoffs nor Finals, Loyd was credited as an important part of the Raptors' championship versus the Warriors, as Loyd was used as a fill-in for Stephen Curry during Raptors' practices, simulating Curry for defensive game planning.

On August 2, 2019, Loyd was waived by the Raptors.

Valencia (2019–2020)
On August 5, 2019, Loyd signed a one-year deal with Valencia of the Spanish Liga ACB and the EuroLeague. On October 13, 2019, Loyd tied his career-high 30 points in his third league game with Valencia, he also recorded four rebounds, two assists and three steals in a 94–97 loss to Barcelona. He averaged 11.9 points, 2.2 assists and 1 steal per game.

Crvena Zvezda (2020–2021)
On July 1, 2020, Loyd signed with Crvena Zvezda. He was named Euroleague Round 2 MVP after scoring 30 points and adding 6 rebounds, 2 assists and 2 steals in a 90–73 win over Saski Baskonia.

Zenit Saint Petersburg (2021–2022) 
On June 14, 2021, Loyd signed a two-year contract with Russian club Zenit Saint Petersburg of the VTB United League and the EuroLeague.

AS Monaco Basket (2022–present) 
On July, 16, 2022, Loyd signed with AS Monaco Basket of the LNB Pro A and the EuroLeague.

Career statistics

Regular season 

|-
| style="text-align:left; background:#afe6ba;"| †
| style="text-align:left;"| Toronto
| 12 || 0 || 4.6 || .444 || .500 || .818 || .8 || .5 || .0 || .0 || 2.4
|- class="sortbottom"
| style="text-align:center;" colspan="2"| Career
| 12 || 0 || 4.6 || .444 || .500 || .818 || .8 || .5 || .0 || .0 || 2.4

EuroLeague

|-
| style="text-align:left;"| 2019–20
| style="text-align:left;" rowspan=1| Valencia
| 18 || 9 || 21.5 || .417 || .429 || .774 || 1.9 || 2.4 || .7 || .1 || 11.1 || 8.8
|-
| style="text-align:left;"| 2020–21
| style="text-align:left;" rowspan=1| Crvena Zvezda
| 29 || 27 || 27.2 || .425 || .311 || .906 || 3.6 || 3.2 || 1.2 || .2 ||17.3 || 16.5
|-
| style="text-align:left;"| 2021–22
| style="text-align:left;" | Zenit 
| 23 || 22 || 27.1 || .497 || .347 || .833 || 4.0 || 3.9 || 1.0 || .1 || 13.2 || 14.4

References

External links
 EuroLeague profile
 RealGM profile
 Indianapolis Greyhounds bio
 

1993 births
Living people
ABA League players
American expatriate basketball people in Canada
American expatriate basketball people in Israel
American expatriate basketball people in Serbia
American expatriate basketball people in Spain
American men's basketball players
AS Monaco Basket players
Basketball League of Serbia players
Basketball players from Atlanta
BC Zenit Saint Petersburg players
Fort Wayne Mad Ants players
Furman Paladins men's basketball players
Hapoel Eilat basketball players
Indianapolis Greyhounds men's basketball players
KK Crvena zvezda players
Liga ACB players
Point guards
Raptors 905 players
Shooting guards
Toronto Raptors players
Undrafted National Basketball Association players
Valencia Basket players